Seremban Forest Heights is a  planned township consisting of 488 acres that in-between Rahang and Senawang, Seremban, Negeri Sembilan, Malaysia, developed by Sunrise MCL Land Sdn Bhd which is a  joint-venture development of UEM Sunrise Berhad and MCL Land Ltd. 

The township consists mainly of residential suites, office complexes and free industry zone development. Forest Heights @ Seremban that nearby to Econsave, Giant, Lotus's and Mydin. 

Their combined strength, resources and expertise will ensure that Seremban Forest Heights becomes a successful landmark and sought after development in Negeri Sembilan.. Seremban Forest Heights is a 15-minutes drive to either Senawang or downtown Seremban and 3 km from both North–South Expressway Southern Route and the Seremban–Port Dickson Highway.

Projects
Among the projects launched for sales are:
Parkland Homes – which include two phrases of residential homes.
Cassia Homes – Bungalow units 
Broadhill - 2 & 3 storey landed house (developed above  sea level 324 feet)
Seremban Business Park
New SJK (C) moved from Ulu Kanchong
New Sekolah Menengah Kebangsaan Taman Forest Heights

References

External links
 Official website
 Subsidiary of MCL Land

Seremban